The Goulburn River National Park is a national park located in New South Wales, Australia,  northwest of Sydney and it is  south-west of Merriwa. It is near the towns of Sandy Hollow, Denman, Merriwa, and Mudgee.

The park with its beautiful surroundings, forest and river offers many opportunities for recreation, such as fishing, hiking, kayaking, swimming and camping.

Animals
The park is a sanctuary for kangaroos, wombats, emus, goannas, platypus, and a wide variety of birds.  It lies within the Mudgee-Wollar Important Bird Area, so identified by BirdLife International because of its importance for the endangered regent honeyeater.

Aboriginal heritage
The park contains some 300 or more aboriginal site (mostly along the river). The Wiradjuri, Gamileroi and Wonnarua Clans peoples have traditionally lived in this area since ancient times.

See also
 Protected areas of New South Wales

References

National parks of the Hunter Region
Upper Hunter Shire
Protected areas established in 1983
1983 establishments in Australia
Important Bird Areas of New South Wales